Elizabeth Martinez may refer to:

 Elizabeth Martínez (1925–2021), American Chicana feminist and community activist
 Elizabeth Martinez (librarian) (born 1943), American librarian